In architecture, a semi-basement is a floor of a building that is half below ground, rather than entirely such as a true basement or cellar.

Traditionally, semi-basements were designed in larger houses where staff was housed. A semi-basement usually contained kitchens and domestic offices. The advantage over a basement is that a semi-basement can let outside light in as it can have windows, albeit ones that are often too high to enjoy a view. Historically this was an advantage as the servants, who traditionally inhabited such a floor, would not have the opportunity to waste time by looking out of the window.

The feature also has the aesthetic value of raising the ground floor, containing  the building's reception rooms higher from the ground in order that they could enjoy better views, and be more free from the damp problems which always arose before the days of modern technology.

Today, London estate agents when selling former servant's rooms as modern apartments often refer to the semi-basement as the "garden floor".

References

Domestic work
Rooms